Skullduggery (also known as Warlock and Blood Puzzle) is a 1983 Canadian horror film directed by Ota Richter.

Plot

The film follows a group of young adults who come together to play a fantasy role playing game, while working at a costume rental store.  One of the players is a young man named Adam (Thom Haverstock) who is the descendant of a long line of men who are all cursed by the devil.  While working at the community college theater performance a strange magician appears and puts a curse on Adam, forcing him to remember the fate of his ancestors and to make him believe that he really is a warlock.

Increasingly Adam is unable to determine the difference between fantasy and reality and believes that, as a warlock, he is on a quest to kill various people.  As the bodies pile up, the local police are baffled and no one suspects that Adam is a deranged serial killer being commanded to kill by the devil.

After playing the role playing game with instructions to kill all the members of the Apostles of Hell before they kill him, Adam attends a costume party hosted by a man named Dr. Evil, who wants Adam to join his cult and also kill most of the party guests. When the police figure out that Adam is the killer, they corner and shoot him in a factory, but his body disappears and leaves a puppet in its place.

At the end of the film, the surviving players are playing a game with a suit of knight's armor seated in Adam's place. The armor comes to life and kills their dungeon master. Upon looking at the body, they learn that their dungeon master was Dr. Evil, and by extension, the devil.

Partial cast
 David Calderisi as Sorcerer / Dr. Evil 
 Wendy Crewson as Barbara / Dorigen 
 Thom Haverstock as Adam 
 David Main as Chuck
 Jim Coburn as Simco The Magician 
 Kate Lynch as Janet 
 Starr Andreeff as Irene
 Claudia Udy as Dolly 
 Clark Johnson as Dave 
 Geordie Johnson as Jake
 Jack Anthony as Mr. Sluszarczuk 
 Sharolyn Sparrow as Carmen
 Patricia Nember as Ginny

Dungeons & Dragons 

The film was released during a time where there was a public backlash against role playing games. Dungeons & Dragons (D&D) games were accused of promoting Satanism and other forms of occult activities among young people.

Release
Originally released in 1983, it was later issued on VHS by Media Home Entertainment, and then licensed to budget label Video Treasures.  The film had a commercial re-release on DVD in January 2008 by JEF Films, although the DVD is considered a bootleg release.

Reception
The film was panned.

References

External links

Rotten Tomatoes

1983 films
1983 horror films
Canadian supernatural horror films
English-language Canadian films
History of role-playing games
1980s English-language films
1980s Canadian films